Ornipholidotos bitjeensis is a butterfly in the family Lycaenidae. It is found in Cameroon, Gabon and the Republic of the Congo. The habitat consists of forests.

References

Butterflies described in 1957
Ornipholidotos